Nicola De Angelis, C.F.I.C (Born 23 January 1939) is Bishop Emeritus of the Roman Catholic Diocese of Peterborough, Ontario, Canada.

Nicola De Angelis was born in Pozzaglia Sabino, Italy, on 23 January 1939. In 1959 he entered the religious order of the Sons of the Immaculate Conception. He immigrated to Canada in 1967 and commenced studies in theology at St. Augustine's Seminary in Toronto. On 6 December 1970, De Angelis was ordained a priest in Toronto, to the Order of the Sons of the Immaculate Conception. During his years in Toronto, Father De Angelis was appointed to the Minister's Advisory Committee for education in Ontario. In the 1970s and early 1980s, he was involved with the Archdiocesan Senate Committee and also with the several Italian Cultural Committees. He was appointed Treasurer General of his religious order in 1984 and moved to Rome to fulfill the duties of this position. On 27 April 1992, he was elected titular Bishop of Remesianna. He was ordained Auxiliary Bishop of Toronto and consecrated in St. Michael's Cathedral on 24 June 1992. On 28 December 2002, Bishop De Angelis was appointed the  Bishop of Peterborough.

References

External links

 Catholic-Hierarchy entry

1939 births
20th-century Roman Catholic bishops in Canada
Living people
Roman Catholic bishops of Peterborough